There was a :Jewish presence in Oman for many centuries, however, the Jewish community of the country is no longer in existence.

Early Jewish history

Some of the earliest Jewish history in what is now Oman is associated with the Biblical/Quranic figure Job/Iyov/Ayyoub. The Tomb of Job is located in Jabal Dohfar 45 miles from the port city of Salalah.

Ishaq bin Yahuda

The subsequent, more documented Omani Jewish community was made famous by Ishaq bin Yahuda, a merchant who lived in the 9th century. Bin Yahuda lived in Sohar, and sailed for China between the years of 882 and 912 after an argument with a Jewish colleague, where he made a great fortune. He returned to Sohar and sailed for China again, but his ship was seized and bin Yahuda was murdered at the port of Sumatra.

Benjamin of Tudela visits Muscat

A historical journey to visit far-flung Jewish communities was undertaken by Rabbi Benjamin of Tudela from 1165 to 1173 that crossed and tracked some of the areas that are today in the geographic area of Oman. His trek began as a pilgrimage to the Holy Land. He may have hoped to settle there, but there is controversy about the reasons for his travels. It has been suggested he may have had a commercial motive as well as a religious one. On the other hand, he may have intended to catalogue the Jewish communities on the route to the Holy Land so as to provide a guide to where hospitality may have been found for Jews travelling to the Holy Land. He took the "long road" stopping frequently, meeting people, visiting places, describing occupations and giving a demographic count of Jews in every town and country.

One of the known towns that Benjamin of Tudela reported as having a Jewish community was Muscat located in the area of Oman in the northern part of the Arabian Peninsula.

Later community

In the mid-19th century, the British Lieutenant James Raymond Wellsted documented the Jews of Muscat in his memoirs Travels in Arabia, vol. 1. He mentions that there are "a few Jews in Muskat (sic), who mostly arrived there in 1828, being driven from Baghdad . . .by the cruelties and extortions of the Pacha Daud." He also notes that Jews were not discriminated against at all in Oman, which was not the case in other Arab countries (they did not have to live in Ghettos, nor identify themselves as Jews, not walk in the road if a Muslim was walking on the same street, as was the case in Yemen). The Jews of Muscat were employed mostly in the making of silver ornaments, banking, and liquor sale. Despite the lack of persecution in Oman, the community is believed to have disappeared before 1900. During World War II, a Jewish American Army enlisted man, Emanuel Glick, encountered a small community of Omani Jews in Muscat, but this community consisted mostly of recent migrants from Yemen.

Modern politics

Omani officials have begun to reach out to Jewish American and Israeli leaders. The American Jewish Committee recently hosted a meeting at which: "Israeli and Omani leaders gathered at AJC to celebrate the tenth anniversary of the Middle East Desalination Research Center, one of the success stories of efforts to deepen Arab-Israeli cooperation. Speakers include Sayyid Badr, secretary-general of the Foreign Ministry of Oman; Israeli Foreign Minister Tzipi Livni; and Charles Lawson of the U.S. State Department. (Video: Israeli, Omani Leaders Celebrate.)

Jews in the Arabian Peninsula

 History of the Jews in Iraq
 History of the Jews in Jordan
 History of the Jews in Bahrain
 History of the Jews in Kuwait
 History of the Jews in Qatar
 History of the Jews in Saudi Arabia
 History of the Jews in the United Arab Emirates
 Yemenite Jews

See also
History of Oman
Oman-Israel Relations
Abrahamic religion
Arab Jews
Arab states of the Persian Gulf
Babylonian captivity
History of the Jews in the Arabian Peninsula
History of the Jews under Muslim rule
Jewish exodus from the Muslim world
Jews outside Europe under Axis occupation
List of Jews from the Arab World
Mizrahi Jews

References

 Tomb of Job
Oman's Jews (jewishvirtuallibrary.org)

History and travels of Benjamin of Tudela
Benjamin of Tudela. The Itinerary of Benjamin of Tudela: Travels in the Middle Ages. trans. Joseph Simon. Pangloss Press, 1993. 
The Itinerary of Benjamin of Tudela. trans. Marcus Nathan Adler. 1907: includes map of route (p. 2) and commentary.

Shatzmiller, Joseph. "Jews, Pilgrimage, and the Christian Cult of Saints: Benjamin of Tudela and His Contemporaries." After Rome's Fall: Narrators and Sources of Early Medieval History. University of Toronto Press: Toronto, 1998.
Jewish Virtual Library: Benjamin of Tudela.

Jewish
Oman
Oman
 
Oman
Oman
Oman
Oman
Oman